James Brown Couper (1870–1946) was Unionist Party (Scotland) MP for Glasgow Maryhill.

He won the seat in 1924, but lost it in 1929.

References 

Members of the Parliament of the United Kingdom for Glasgow constituencies
1870 births
1946 deaths
UK MPs 1924–1929
Unionist Party (Scotland) MPs
Maryhill